Carlos Alberto Silva Angeja (born 12 November 1936) is a former Portuguese professional footballer.

Career statistics

Club

Notes

References

External links

1936 births
Living people
Portuguese footballers
Portugal youth international footballers
Association football forwards
Segunda Divisão players
Primeira Liga players
C.F. Os Belenenses players
Atlético Clube de Portugal players
S.L. Benfica footballers
Amora F.C. players